Ranularia sinensis, common name: the Chinese triton, is a species of predatory sea snail, a marine gastropod mollusk in the family Cymatiidae.

This species was originally described by Reeve in 1844 as  Cymatium (Ranularia) sinense

Description
The shell size varies between 50mm and 94 mm

Distribution
This marine species occurs off South Japan and New South Wales, Australia.

References

External links
 

Cymatiidae
Gastropods described in 1844